Killeshandra or Killashandra, is a village in County Cavan, Ireland. Together with the Lough Oughter Special Protected Area (SPA), it has been recognised by the EU programme for wildlife Natura 2000 since 2010. Killeshandra is noted by Fáilte Ireland as an "Angling Centre of Excellence", and as a hub for the Cavan Walking Festival which takes place in May each year. There are several looped walking and cycling trails in Killykeen Forest Park. The town is also home to Killeshandra Gaelic Football Club, known locally as the Killeshandra Leaguers. Rockfield Lake, which is popular with anglers, is a few kilometres southwest of the town.

History

Killeshandra owes its name to the Church of the old Ráth (ringfort) . The church was first noted in Papal registers during the medieval 14th century when installed John McKiernan a cleric from the Augustinian St Mary's Drumlane Priory.  The early Killeshandra town began during the seventeenth century Ulster Plantation period, when Sir Alexander Hamilton of Innerwick Castle, East Lothian, Scotland, was granted lands by the Crown in July 1610 to build a strong bawn and create a Protestant community around the barony of Tullyhunco. The 1641 rising led to the burning of the township followed by the surrender of the Hamilton's together with their Scottish Craigie neighbours, forced out of their settled lands by the Cavan O'Reilly rebel army.

Following the Restoration period after the civil war, that Sir Francis Hamilton (1st Baron of Castle Hamilton) regained control of the area. He set about building a new market town of Killeshandra with Scottish settlers and migrant French Huguenot exiles who were especially noted for their industry linen skills and thrift. The new settlers and their families quickly adapted to the local conditions, beginning to grow flax and process linen in the Cavan region.

From the early 17th century the 'Church of the Old Rath' was reformed for Protestant  Scottish Episcopalian use and included glebe lands allocated by the Hamiltons to the Anglican Kilmore diocese. Later in the century when peace was restored, the church was remodelled after the death in 1688 of Sir Charles (2nd Baron of Castle Hamilton) as a lasting memorial to departed members of the original Scottish Hamilton family. The remains of this church today form part of a protected monument along with the graveyard, enclosure wall & gate pieers,  can still be seen at the lower end of the town (opposite Lakeland Dairies). When Sir Francis (3rd Baron of Castle Hamilton) died in 1713 he was brought to Newtownards, Co. Down to be interred together with his (first) wife Lady Catherine Montgomery (died 1692), in a Montgomery family vault. A large marble memorial plaque exists in the present Killeshandra Church of Ireland commemorating the life of Sir Francis Hamilton (3rd Baron of Castle Hamilton) was subscribed to by Sir Francis surviving (2nd) wife Lady Anna Hamilton whom was later remarried in England, to the Governor of Jamaica.

The historic Rath church displays some unusual architectural characteristics; it is T-shaped, with a south-facing transept created in the Renaissance neo-classical style, described in the Pevsner Guide to South Ulster as "arguably the finest Restoration building in Ulster, a handsome evocation of the improving architectural eloquence of the age". The east-facing window is in the more traditional Gothic style. Sir Charles Hamilton (2nd Baron of Castle Hamilton)  heraldic embellishment is visible on the south gable wall and gate piers/pillars. When a new Anglican church was built (circa 1842) further up the main street, some of the earlier Hamilton family memorials attributed to well-known Irish sculptor William Kidwell were brought from the old church and placed inside the new building, where they can still be seen. The graveyard continued in "mixed" denomination community use for well over a century after the church was closed and unroofed (c1842). It is now protected by Cavan County Council as a National Monument. The graveyard includes some interesting 18th-19th century grave slabs, mausoleums and heraldic memorials from Killeshandra families dating back to the early 18th century.

Flax and Linen
Killeshandra, since the early 18th century earned a reputation for becoming a Linen Town when the local cottage flax growing and linen industry expanded considerably following an incentive from the Ulster Board of Trustees of Linen Manufacturers.  Killeshandra was later described in Pigot's 1824 Directory as - "The greatest linen market in the county, and the inhabitants of the town and neighbourhood are principally employed in its manufacture".   However, failure to gain support from the major local landlords including Lord Farnham and the Earl Annesley to capitalise on industrial methods of linen production when market sales approached their peak meant that Killeshandra would inevitably lose in the race to compete with the bigger Ulster linen-exporting towns further north, eventually causing hardship and destitution for many local flax growers and linen producers.  As local industry peaked in 1790 the Erection of a Market House for the benefit of the Town and Vicinity, by Nichola Ann (nee Hamilton 1724-1804) the widow of Richard Jackson from Forkhill, Co. Armagh, co-heiress daughter of Arthur Cecil Hamilton of Castle Hamilton. The market-house was also once used as a district courthouse, demolished during the late 1960s to make way for widening of the Main street.  A stone plaque describing the erection of the Market House is still visible on the wall of a Main Street shop premises. Possibly the earliest market house built in County Cavan.

Unrelated to the above - for around forty years Missionary Sisters of the Holy Rosary founded since 1924 in Killeshandra, and are sometimes referred to as the Killeshandra Nuns. The convent has now been demolished and lands occupied by Lakeland Dairies Limited.

Population and demographics
According to the CSO 2016 census, at that time Killeshandra's population stood at 388 persons, an increase of 6.6% from 364 in the 2011 census, which in turn showed an 11% drop in population from the 2006 census. Compare population levels in 1911, when the town population was 566 persons (46% higher than present levels). However, in the electoral division, which includes the town and surrounding district, a slight increase in population up to 1,141 persons was recorded in 2011. In previous centuries, when there were several thousand people living near Killeshandra, local industry and agriculture sustained the local population.

1841 Killeshandra Census
The 1841 census of Ireland returned an all Ireland population count of just under 8.2 million persons. This was the first Irish census where families were asked to fill out a form showing the social aspects and occupations of all house occupants and filled in by the head of family, for collection by an Enumerator selected from the local Constabulary. Very few Irish censuses survive prior to 1901 due to the burning of the Dublin Public Records Office during the 1922 Irish Civil War.
The Killeshandra 1841 census was one of the few census from all over Ireland to have been saved and is available online for viewing on the National Archives website. Of particular note in 1841 are the households involved in the local cottage flax spinning and weaving industry, making Killeshandra an important centre within the county for linen production.

Economic changes

Killeshandra's core economy remains largely based upon its agriculture, cottage industries producing flax and linen during the 18th and early 19th century. Killeshandra Co-operative Creamery, formed in 1896 became one of Ireland's early leaders in dairy and milk processing, reaching out to local farmers and milk producers. From the early twentieth century Killeshandra became a hub of industry in the region aided by the railway for movement of goods. Several flax and corn mills remained in operation in addition to Fletcher's timber sawmill, which was built on the site of an earlier brewery. From the 1880s the town was serviced by a railway line linking Crosdoney and Cavan town. However, the closure of the railway to goods and passengers in 1960 was the first significant result of population decline throughout the region. The eventual closure of Fletcher's sawmill and the demise of street market trading brought an end to the Killeshandra market-house.

Today Killeshandra, in addition to being a base for the Lakeland Dairy Company, is a tourist destination within County Cavan for anglers, walkers and wildlife enthusiasts. The Lough Bawn Hotel is located in the middle of the village and there are several local B&Bs popular for visiting anglers. Killeshandra has shops, two national schools, denominational churches, restaurants and several pubs. A community hall was completed in September 2013, replacing a hall built in the 1970s. The new hall has a large open space for indoor sporting events, as well as space for dancing, concerts and exhibitions.

Public transport

Bus
From September 2018, Local Link Cavan-Monaghan route 929 will serve the town with four journeys in each direction, linking the town with Cavan, Newtowngore and Ballinamore. The town is also served by several Local Link Cavan Monaghan door-to-door routes.

Bus Éireann serves the town once weekly on Tuesdays, with route 465 providing a return journey to Cavan via Arvagh and Ballinagh, and a one-way to journey to Carrigallen.

Rail
Killashandra railway station was once the terminus of a short branch railway line between Cavan and Crossdoney on the Midland Great Western Railway line. Opened in 1886, the Killeshandra branch line, along with the Crossdoney to Cavan line, discontinued passenger service in 1947. The line remained open for goods traffic until 1959, then was closed completely in January 1960. Most of the rail infrastructure is now gone, but the station and a nearby goods shed still remain.

Dairy industry
Lakeland Dairies, which is the second largest dairy co-operative and third largest dairy processor in Ireland, has its headquarters in Killeshandra.

The dairy industry in Killeshandra began when the Drummully Co-operative Society was founded on 23 September 1896. A committee decided to establish a creamery in Killeshandra when local farmers promised the milk from 987 cows. In March 1898, the new dairy business became known as the Killeshandra Co-operative Agricultural Society. That business was successful, winning prizes for butter and dairy products at home and abroad. In 1996, a century after its founding, Killeshandra Co-op was handling the milk from over 4,000 farmer suppliers. Today this co-op has transformed through mergers with other companies to form Lakeland Dairies.

The Lakeland Dairies co-operative operates on a cross-border basis, employing over 800 people and has 2,400 dairy farmers supplying milk to the co-operative across 15 counties.

In October 2013, Lakeland Dairies purchased the former Ulster Bank premises in Killeshandra town, next door to the company's headquarters.

People
Michael Donohoe, former Democratic U.S. Representative of Pennsylvania, born in Killeshandra.
William Farrell, designer of the Killeshandra Church of Ireland building.
William Hales, author and for 43 years rector of Killeshandra.
Stephen King, former Cavan Gaelic football star.
Thomas Lough, pioneer of Killeshanadra Co-operative Agricultural & Dairy Society. Also liberal MP for West Islington, London.
John Joe O'Reilly, former Cavan Gaelic football star.
Philip O'Reilly, former MP for Cavan and 1641 Rebellion leader.
Tom O'Reilly, former Cavan politician.
Eamonn Owens, actor in The Butcher Boy (film).
George Richardson (VC) of Derrylane, Killeshandra.
Charles H. Fletcher, national Chairman of the Irish Creamery Milk Supplier Association (ICMSA) 1950-52

In popular culture
The Ohioan Irish folk band Brady's Leap has released a CD entitled The Road to Killeshandra. William Greenway, poet and Professor of English at Youngstown State University, sings on the title track.
Dominic Behan's song Come Out Ye Black and Tans refers to the "green and lovely lanes of Killeshandra".
In the Irish folk song Cavan Girl, the first-person narrator walks "the road from Killeshandra" that runs "twelve long miles around the lake to get to Cavan town".

Further reading
, mostly community photographs spanning the twentieth century.
 An excellent pictorial and personal account of a changing Killeshandra from the 1930s onwards.
Pevsner Architectural Guide to the Buildings of Ireland - South Ulster - Armagh, Cavan and Monaghan by Kevin V. Mulligan (2013) Includes several references to buildings in and around Killeshandra.
 An Introduction to the Architectural Heritage of County Cavan - published by the Department of Arts Heritage and the Gaeltacht (2013). Part of the national architectural heritage survey which includes several references to buildings in and around Killeshandra.
 The Ulster Plantation in Counties of Armagh and Cavan 1608-1641 by R.J. Hunter (2012) includes several historic references to Killeshandra.
 Book refers to Killeshandra area before, during and after the Ulster Plantation.
 How tenants got back the land lost in the Ulster Plantation (1809-1903)

Conservation and Management Plan of Jacobean Church, Killeshandra, Co.Cavan - June 2013 - published by Cavan County Council & The Heritage Council.
 Killeshandra St.Brigid's School/Scoil Bhride Reunion "Legacy of Learning" 3 June 2017

See also
 List of towns and villages in Ireland
 Market Houses in Ireland
 Irish linen

References

External links

Killeshandra Tourism website
History of the Hamiltons of Castle Hamilton doc
Killeshandra Parish Church, building & stainglass windows pics
Killeshandra Loop Walk with downloadable map
Killeshandra Town Site

Towns and villages in County Cavan
Civil parishes of County Cavan